Vina Evelyn Hayes (1 June 1912 - 26 December 1988), better known as Evie Hayes, was an American-born actor and singer, best known for her stage success in Australia. She was once described as "the most popular box office attraction in Australian musical comedy since Gladys Moncrieff."

Biography 

Born in Seattle to George Hayes and Eva, a soubrette, Evie Hayes appeared on stage from an early age and worked steadily in vaudeville, radio and nightclubs. Having moved to New York, she worked as a song plugger at the publishing house of Irving Berlin. She was the leading lady for Will Mahoney, in his tour of the United Kingdom and Europe and sang for the BBC and appeared in cabaret and made her own recordings. She appeared in the film Hold Everything in 1930 and had other small roles in musicals

Hayes married Mahoney in Westminster, London in 1938, and the couple went to Australia to appear on the Tivoli circuit, and proved very popular, eventually deciding to stay in the country permanently. They appeared in the film Come Up Smiling (1939), managed the Cremorne Theatre in Brisbane, presenting everything from revues, pantomimes and musicals and entertained the American and Australasian troops and raising funds for the war effort. Hayes played the lead role in the Australian production of Annie Get Your Gun, which ran for more than three years.

On television since its inception, she appeared as a compere, singer, comedian and a commercial presenter on the Graham Kennedy show IMT. Despite being diagnosed with MS in 1969, she continued her career. She later appeared regularly on television, including as a judge on light entertainment program Young Talent Time. She also opened her own talent school, and acted in productions of Mata Hari, The Flame of Istanbul, Funny Girl, Kiss Me, Kate, a revival of Oklahoma! and Call Me Madam.

She died of a heart attack, early in the morning of 26 December 1988, in Melbourne, Victoria.

Filmography
Come Up Smiling (1939) (Kitty Katkin)
Caravan Holiday (short) (1972)

References

External links
Evie Hayes at Australian Dictionary of Biography

Evie Hayes Australian Theatre credits at AusStage
Evie Hayes at National Film and Sound Archive

1912 births
1988 deaths
20th-century American actresses
American television actresses
American film actresses
Actresses from Seattle
Actresses from Melbourne
American emigrants to Australia
American stage actresses
People with multiple sclerosis